"Three Words" is song recorded by South Korean boy band Sechs Kies, released on October 7, 2016, as a digital single by YG Entertainment and later included on their 2017 compilation album, The 20th Anniversary. It was written by Tablo while the production was done by Future Bounce. Musically, it is a mid-tempo ballad.

"Three Words" was the first single released by Sechs Kies after their disbandment in 2000. It was commercially successful in South Korea where it peaked at number one on the Gaon Digital Chart.

Charts

References

External links
 

Sechs Kies songs
Korean-language songs
2016 singles
2016 songs
YG Entertainment singles
Gaon Digital Chart number-one singles